Ibrahim Rabimov (born 3 August 1987) is a retired Tajik professional footballer who played as a midfielder.

Career statistics

International

Statistics accurate as of match played 11 June 2015

International goals

Honors

Club
Aviator Bobojon Ghafurov/Parvoz Bobojon Ghafurov
Tajik Cup (1): 2004
Regar-TadAZ Tursunzoda
Tajik League (3): 2006, 2007, 2008
Tajik Cup (1): 2006
Istiklol
Tajik League (1): 2011
Tajik Cup (1): 2013
AFC President's Cup (1): 2012

International
Tajikistan
AFC Challenge Cup (1): 2006

Individual 
CIS Cup top goalscorer: 2009 (shared)

References

External links
Player profile – doha-2006.com

1987 births
Living people
Sportspeople from Dushanbe
Tajikistani footballers
Tajikistan international footballers
Tajikistan Higher League players
FC Istiklol players
Footballers at the 2006 Asian Games
Association football midfielders
Asian Games competitors for Tajikistan